Metoecus paradoxus, also known as the wasp nest beetle and eyelash bug, is a species of Metoecus in the family Ripiphoridae.

Description
M. paradoxus measures approximately 10 mm in length. It has a dark head and body and paler, orange-coloured pointed elytra that do not completely cover the abdomen. It has feathery antennae.

Biology and lifecycle
M. paradoxus is primarily a parasitoid of Vespula vulgaris (the common wasp). Adult females lay eggs in decaying wood in autumn, which hatch in spring or summer. The first instar triungulin clings to a V. vulgaris worker to be transported to the nest. Once at the nest, the larva parasitises a wasp larva – once the larva has closed the cell, the M. paradoxus larva consumes the host and pupates in its place. Adults emerge from late July to early October. The development from larva to adult takes less than one month. Adult beetles live for between 6 and 12 days and probably do not feed.

Pop culture
In 2020, American rapper Megan Thee Stallion created an Instagram post featuring a video of her and a female friend talking about a beetle with large antennae in Megan's house. Megan's friend asks what the bug is, and Megan responds with, "Uh, bitch, it's a eyelash bug," and the two laugh. Megan then says the bug's eyelashes are "on fleek" and says that "[It] just got [its] eyelashes done, at the club." The bug then begins to fly, Megan and her friend scream, and the video stops. A second recording shows comments of people reacting to it and identifying it as M. paradoxus as Megan's friend shows her images of it, to which Megan replies, "Bitch, that is her. Look at them damn lashes! That is crazy." The first video has since gone viral and has become an internet meme.

However, the bug in the video resembles a male Pterotus obscuripennis, of the firefly family, more.

References

Ripiphoridae
Beetles described in 1761
Taxa named by Carl Linnaeus